Kinchah (also Romanized as Kīnchāh; also known as Kin’cha) is a village in Kurka Rural District, in the Central District of Astaneh-ye Ashrafiyeh County, Gilan Province, Iran. At the 2006 census, its population was 303, in 91 families.

References 

Populated places in Astaneh-ye Ashrafiyeh County